The Roscommon county football team represents Roscommon in men's Gaelic football and is governed by Roscommon GAA, the county board of the Gaelic Athletic Association. The team competes in the three major annual inter-county competitions; the All-Ireland Senior Football Championship, the Connacht Senior Football Championship and the National Football League.

Roscommon's home ground is Dr Hyde Park, Roscommon. The team's manager is Davy Burke.

Roscommon was the third Connacht county both to win an All-Ireland Senior Football Championship (SFC), as well as to appear in the final, following Mayo and Galway. The team last won the Connacht Senior Championship in 2019, the All-Ireland Senior Championship in 1944 and the National League in 1979.

Kit evolution
Black and green until 1935.

History
Roscommon were a glamour team of the 1940s, winning the All-Ireland Senior Football Championship (SFC) on consecutive occasions, and have contributed some of the great personalities to GAA history including 2 Presidents - Dan O'Rourke (1946–49) and Dr Donal Keenan (1973–76).

Roscommon's rise from Junior status to Senior All-Ireland champions in the four years leading up to 1943 was one of the great romances of its time. In the All Ireland final they drew with Cavan, before winning the replay with two quick goals from Frankie Kinlough and Jack McQuillan. Kinlough scored the goal and Donal Keenan the points the following year when Roscommon beat Kerry. Roscommon were captained by Jamesie Murray from Knockcroghery.

Legend tells how Roscommon lost a six-point lead in the final three minutes of the 1946 All-Ireland Senior Football Championship final against Kerry, Tom Gega O'Connor and Paddy Kennedy scoring the goals. Roscommon were beaten in the replay (Gerry Dolan made one of the greatest saves in Croke Park history against Laois in that year's semi-final). The injured team-captain, Jimmy Murray, was having blood wiped from his face to "look right" for the presentation when Kerry struck for two late equalising goals. Defeats in 1947, 1952 and 1953 semi-finals ended the party.

The 1940s successes were the pinnacle of Roscommon's achievements. They also reached the final in 1962. That year was memorable for they were losing the Connacht final to Galway by 5 points when Roscommon keeper Aidan Brady swung on the crossbar, breaking it in two. During the 15-minute wait to get it replaced, Roscommon moved the great Gerry O'Malley to midfield in a re-organisation and he inspired their comeback to enable them to win the Connacht Championship. However, Kerry, once again, led by the great Mick O'Connell defeated them in the All-Ireland final thanks in no small way to an off-the-ball incident which led to O'Malley being stretchered off very early in the game. Roscommon's next period of success came in the late 1970s when they won 4 Connacht titles on the trot from 77-80. they reached the final in 1980 against Kerry. They looked like causing an upset when John "Jigger" O'Connor's 35th-second goal helped them to an early 1-2 to 0-0 lead, but this was the Kerry team regarded as the greatest in history, and they eventually won by 1-9 to 1-6. A series of minor championships (1981, 1984, 1989 and 1992), and an All-Ireland Under-21 final in 1982, showed the impact of that success and in 1990 and 1991 Roscommon emerged from Connacht again, succumbing to Meath by a single point in the 1991 All Ireland semi-final.

Nine unsuccessful seasons followed before, in 2001, Roscommon regained the Connacht title following a brilliant win and performance over eventual All-Ireland champions Galway and a very dramatic end-of-match victory over Mayo. However, they failed to make any further progress in the 2001 All Ireland Championship and the decade that followed was amongst the least successful in the team's history.

On the field, outside of a very exciting run in 2003, the senior team failed to record any notable successes since their 2001 Connacht Championship title win until 2010. The success of the county's Minor team in winning the All-Ireland title in 2006 offered hope, however.

In 2010, Roscommon captured their 20th Senior Connacht football title. In the first round they defeated London in Ruislip 0-14 to 0-6. In the semi final played in Dr Hyde Park Roscommon beat Leitrim 1-13 to 0-11. In the final played in McHale Park, Roscommon overcame favourites Sligo on a scoreline of 0-14 to 0-13. Roscommon were subsequently beaten in the All-Ireland Quarter Final in Croke Park by Cork 1-16 to 0-10.

Roscommon made their return to Division 1 of the National Football League in 2016 and enjoyed a successful campaign picking up wins against Kerry, Cork, Donegal and Down, before losing a League semi-final to Kerry at Croke Park. However, they endured a disappointing Championship. A draw against Galway in the Connacht Final in terrible conditions brought them to a replay in Castlebar, where Roscommon went on to lose by 11 points. They exited the All-Ireland Championship with a 4th Round Qualifier loss to Clare.

Roscommon were subsequently relegated from Division 1 of the League in 2017 after losing all but 1 of their games. In 2018 Roscommon were promoted back to Division 1 by topping the Division 2 group and winning the Division 2 title in Croke Park against Cavan.

Roscommon beat Galway in the 2017 Connacht Senior Football Championship final on a scoreline of 2-15 to 0-12. It was Roscommon's 23rd Connacht SFC final win, a first since 2010 and a first at Pearse Stadium since 1978.

On 5 September 2018 after 3 years in charge Kevin McStay stepped down as Roscommon manager, "I feel I have brought the team as far as I can at this stage and a new voice and direction is now required" he said on his departure. Anthony Cunningham, former Galway hurler and hurling manager took over from McStay. Roscommon won the Connacht title in Cunningham's maiden year at the helm, defeating Galway in Salthill to claim their 23rd JJ Nestor Cup.

Galway lost the 2019 Connacht SFC final to Roscommon at Pearse Stadium, despite Roscommon being behind by five points at half-time.

Roscommon's 2020 Connacht SFC quarter-final game against London did not occur due to COVID-19, with New York in 2021 also not occurring.

Support
A voluntary fundraising body, Club Rossie, exists.

Current panel

INJ Player has had an injury which has affected recent involvement with the county team.
RET Player has since retired from the county team.
WD Player has since withdrawn from the county team due to a non-injury issue.

Midfielder Ultan Harney left the panel ahead of the 2023 season to go travelling abroad.

Current management team
Manager: Davy Burke, appointed on a three-year term in October 2022
Selectors:
Coach: Mark McHugh (Kilcar)
Management team: Eddie Lohan, Gerry McGowan (Tourlestrane)

Managerial history
Roscommon have a recent history of appointing "non-native" managers, doing so on several occasions in the 21st-century. The first of those, John Tobin, won a Connacht SFC in 2001 and latter two McStay and Cunningham won Connacht senior titles for Roscommon in 2017 and 2019.

(n) = McStay continued as manager by himself after O'Donnell's departure.

Players

Notable players

Nigel Dineen
Karol Mannion
Fergal O'Donnell, 2001 Connacht SFC-winning captain

Records
Dermot Earley Snr is the team's top scorer in National Football League history, finishing his career with 17–316 (367) in that competition.

All Stars

Competitive record

All-Ireland Senior Football Championship
This is Roscommon's record in All-Ireland SFC finals. Bold denotes a year in which the team won the competition.

National Football League
This is Roscommon's record in National Football League finals. Bold denotes a year in which the team won the competition.

Honours

National
All-Ireland Senior Football Championship
 Winners (2): 1943, 1944
 Runners-up (3): 1946, 1962, 1980
National Football League
 Winners (1): 1978–79
 Runners-up (2): 1973–74, 1980–81
National Football League Division Two
 Winners (4): 2015, 2018, 2020, 2022
National Football League Division Three
 Winners (1): 2014
All-Ireland Junior Football Championship
 Winners (2): 1940, 2000
All-Ireland Under-21 Football Championship
 Winners (2): 1966, 1978
All-Ireland Minor Football Championship
 Winners (4): 1939, 1941, 1951, 2006

Provincial
Connacht Senior Football Championship
 Winners (23): 1892, 1905, 1912, 1914, 1943, 1944, 1946, 1947, 1952, 1953, 1961, 1962, 1972, 1977, 1978, 1979, 1980, 1990, 1991, 2001, 2010, 2017, 2019
 Runners-up (25): 1906, 1911, 1915, 1916, 1919, 1925, 1931, 1941, 1942, 1950, 1955, 1970, 1974, 1976, 1985, 1986, 1988, 1989, 1992, 1993, 1998, 2011, 2016, 2018, 2022
Connacht FBD League
 Winners (5): 1997, 1999, 2015, 2018 2019
Connacht Junior Football Championship 11
 Winners (11): 1929 (awarded), 1932, 1939, 1940, 1959, 1964, 1999, 2000, 2006, 2008, 2009
Connacht Under-21 Football Championship
 Winners (9): 1966, 1969, 1978, 1982, 1999, 2010, 2012, 2014, 2015
Connacht Minor Football Championship
 Winners (14): 1939, 1941, 1949, 1951, 1965, 1967, 1975, 1981, 1984, 1989, 1992, 2006, 2011, 2012

References

 
County football teams